The Chinese zodiac is a traditional classification scheme based on the Chinese calendar that assigns an animal and its reputed attributes to each year in a repeating twelve-year cycle. Originating from China, the zodiac and its variations remain popular in many East Asian and Southeast Asian countries, such as Japan, South Korea, Vietnam, Singapore, Nepal, Bhutan, Cambodia, and Thailand.

Identifying this scheme using the generic term "zodiac" reflects several superficial similarities to the Western zodiac: both have time cycles divided into twelve parts, each labels at least the majority of those parts with names of animals, and each is widely associated with a culture of ascribing a person's personality or events in their life to the supposed influence of the person's particular relationship to the cycle.

Nevertheless, there are major differences between the two: the animals of the Chinese zodiac are not associated with constellations spanned by the ecliptic plane. The Chinese twelve-part cycle corresponds to years, rather than months.

Signs

The zodiac traditionally begins with the sign of the Rat. The following are the twelve zodiac signs in order, each with its associated characteristics (Heavenly Stems, Earthly Branch, yin/yang force, Trine, and nature element).

In Chinese astrology the animal signs assigned by year represent how others perceive one or how one presents oneself. It is a common misconception that the animals assigned by year are the only signs, and many Western descriptions of Chinese astrology draw solely on this system. In fact, there are also animal signs assigned by month (called "inner animals"), by day (called "true animals") and hours (called "secret animals"). The Earth is all twelve signs, with five seasons.

Michel Ferlus (2013) notes that the Old Chinese names of the earthly branches are of Austroasiatic origin. Some of Ferlus' comparisons are given below, with Old Chinese reconstructions cited from Baxter & Sagart (2014).

 : Old Chinese *[n̥]ruʔ (compare Proto-Viet-Muong *c.luː 'water buffalo')
 : Old Chinese *[m].qʰˤaʔ (compare Proto-Viet-Muong *m.ŋəːˀ)
 : Old Chinese *[g]ˤəʔ (compare Northern Proto-Viet-Muong *kuːrˀ)

There is also a lexical correspondence with Austronesian:
 : Old Chinese *m[ə]t-s (compare Atayal miːts)

The terms for the earthly branches are attested from Shang Dynasty inscriptions and were likely also used before Shang times. Ferlus (2013) suggests that the terms may have been ancient pre-Shang borrowings from Austroasiatic languages that were spoken in the Yangtze River region.

Decans 
The Chinese zodiac features decans in the form of thirty-six calendar animals (三十六生肖, sānshíliù shēngxiào; 'thirty-six zodiac signs'). The group originated in China, wherein the 36 were divided into four clusters, with each cluster made up of nine animal-deity pairs. The four clusters represent the four cardinal directions (north, south, east, west). The animals are also grouped in triads—three animals are combined under one of 12 zodiac signs.

In Japan, the decans are known as Sanjūroku Kingyōzō (三十六禽形像; alternatively known as the Chikusan Reiki 畜産暦), but some of them are different from their Chinese counterparts. The group appeared in the Nichū Reki 二中暦, a Japanese calendar from the second half of the 14th century. Eight of the 36 appear “fox like”—almost identical in physical attributes. These eight include the tanuki, mujina, fox, wolf, jackal, wild cat, and wild male-female dogs. The mujina, fox and rabbit are combined under the zodiacal sign of the rabbit. The tanuki, leopard, and tiger are combined under the zodiacal sign of the tiger.

Chinese calendar

Years

Within the Four Pillars, the year is the pillar representing information about the person's family background and society or relationship with their grandparents. The person's age can also be easily deduced from their sign, the current sign of the year, and the person's generational disposition (teens, mid-20s, and so on). For example, a person born a Tiger is 12, 24, 36, (etc.) years old in the year of the Tiger (2022); in the year of the Rabbit (2023), that person is one year older.

The following table shows the 60-year cycle matched up to the Gregorian calendar for the years 1924–2043. The sexagenary cycle begins at lichun about February 4 according to some astrological sources.

Months and solar terms

Within the Four Pillars, the month is the pillar representing information about the person's parents or childhood. Many Chinese astrologers consider the month pillar to be the most important one in determining the circumstances of one's adult life.

The twelve animals are also linked to the traditional Chinese agricultural calendar, which runs alongside the better known Lunar calendar. Instead of months, this calendar is divided into 24 two-week segments known as Solar Terms. Each animal is linked to two of these solar terms for a period similar to the Western month. Unlike the 60-year Lunar calendar, which can vary by as much as a month in relation to the Gregorian calendar, the agricultural calendar varies by only one day, beginning on the Gregorian calendar on 3 or 4 February every year. Again, unlike the cycle of the lunar years, which begins with the Rat, the agricultural calendar begins with the Tiger as it is the first animal of spring.

As each sign is linked to a month of the solar year, it is thereby also linked to a season. Each of the elements are also linked to a season (see above), and the element that shares a season with a sign is known as the sign's fixed element. In other words, that element is believed to impart some of its characteristics to the sign concerned. The fixed element of each sign applies also to the year and hour signs, and not just the monthly sign. The fixed element is separate from the cycle of elements which interact with the signs in the 60-year cycle.

Day
Four pillars calculators can determine the zodiac animal of the day. Chinese animal signs rule over days of the week, too. The term for them is "True Animals". If one's astrologer wishes to prepare an astrological chart (aka horoscope), it is essential they know the animal and element of one's day of birth. However, due to there being twelve animals and a ten-day week on the ancient Chinese calendar, it is not easy to find one's day element or animal. As the Day Master (element) affects the element of the Hour animal, among other things, caution is required when calculating this part of the chart. A professional will likely have tools for such a calculator on hand, but many online calculators that feature all four animals will also provide an accurate chart.

Compatibility

As the Chinese zodiac is derived according to the ancient Five Elements Theory, every Chinese sign is associated with five elements with relations, among those elements, of interpolation, interaction, over-action, and counter-action—believed to be the common law of motions and changes of creatures in the universe. Different people born under each animal sign supposedly have different personalities, and practitioners of Chinese astrology consult such traditional details and compatibilities to offer putative guidance in life or for love and marriage.

Four Pillars of Destiny

The Four Pillars of Destiny method can be traced back to the Han dynasty ( 220 CE), and is still much used in feng shui astrology and general analysis today. The Four Pillars or columns chart is called such as the Chinese writing causes it to fall into columns. Each pillar or column contains a stem and a branch—and each column relates to the year, month, day and hour of birth. The first column refers to the year animal and element, the second to the month animal and element, the third to the day animal and element, and the last to the hour animal and element.

Within the Four Pillars of Destiny, the year column purports to provide information about one's ancestor or early age, and the month column about one's parents or growing age. The day column purports to offer information about oneself (upper character) and one's spouse (lower character) or adult age, and the hour column about children or late age.

Animal trines

First
The first trine consists of the Rat, Dragon, and Monkey. These three signs are said to be intense and powerful individuals capable of great good, who make great leaders but are rather unpredictable. The three are said to be intelligent, magnanimous, charismatic, charming, authoritative, confident, eloquent, and artistic, but can be manipulative, jealous, selfish, aggressive, vindictive, and deceitful.

Second
The second trine consists of the Ox, Snake, and Rooster. These three signs are said to possess endurance and application, with slow accumulation of energy, meticulous at planning but tending to hold fixed opinions. The three are said to be intelligent, hard-working, modest, industrious, loyal, philosophical, patient, goodhearted, and morally upright, but can also be self-righteous, egotistical, vain, judgmental, narrow-minded, and petty.

Third
The third trine consists of the Tiger, Horse, and Dog. These three signs are said to seek true love, to pursue humanitarian causes, to be idealistic and independent but tending to be impulsive. The three are said to be productive, enthusiastic, independent, engaging, dynamic, honorable, loyal, and protective, but can also be rash, rebellious, quarrelsome, anxious, disagreeable, and stubborn.

Fourth
The fourth trine consists of the Rabbit, Goat, and Pig. These three signs are said to have a calm nature and somewhat reasonable approach; they seek aesthetic beauty and are artistic, well-mannered and compassionate, yet detached and resigned to their condition. The three are said to be caring, self-sacrificing, obliging, sensible, creative, empathetic, tactful, and prudent, but can also be naïve, pedantic, insecure, selfish, indecisive, and pessimistic.

Origin stories

There are many stories and fables to explain the beginning of the zodiac. Since the Han Dynasty, the twelve Earthly Branches have been used to record the time of day. However, for the sake of entertainment and convenience, they have been replaced by the twelve animals, and a mnemonic refers to the behavior of the animals:

Earthly Branches may refer to a double-hour period. In the latter case it is the center of the period; for instance, 马 (Horse) means noon as well as a period from 11:00 to 13:00.

Great Race

An ancient folk story called the "Great Race" tells that the Jade Emperor decreed that the years on the calendar would be named for each animal in the order they reached him. To get there, the animals would have to cross a river.

Variations

Another folk story tells that the Rat deceived the Ox into letting it jump on its back, in order for the Ox to hear the Rat sing, before jumping off at the finish line and finishing first. Another variant says that the Rat had cheated the Cat out its place at the finishing line, having stowed-away on the dog's back, who was too focused to notice that he had a stow-away; this is said to account for the antagonistic dynamic between cats and rats, beyond normal predator-and-prey behaviour; and also why dogs and cats fight, the cat having tried to attack the rat in retaliation, only to get the dog by accident.

In Chinese mythology, a story tells that the cat was tricked by the Rat so it could not go to the banquet. This is why the cat is ultimately not part of the Chinese zodiac.

In Buddhism, legend has it that Gautama Buddha summoned all of the animals of the Earth to come before him before his departure from this Earth, but only twelve animals actually came to bid him farewell. To reward the animals who came to him, he named a year after each of them. The years were given to them in the order they had arrived.

The twelve animals of the Chinese zodiac were developed in the early stages of Chinese civilization, therefore it is difficult to investigate its real origins. Most historians agree that the cat is not included, as they had not yet been introduced to China from India with the arrival of Buddhism. However, the Vietnamese, unlike all other countries who follow the Sino lunar calendar, have the cat instead of the rabbit as a zodiac animal. The most common explanation is that the ancient word for Rabbit (Mao) sounds like cat (Meo).

Problems with English translation

Due to confusion with synonyms during translation, some of the animals depicted by the English words did not exist in ancient China. For example:
The term  Rat can be translated as Mouse, as there are no distinctive words for the two genera in Chinese. However, Rat is the most commonly used one among all the synonyms.
The term  Ox, a castrated Bull, can be translated interchangeably with other terms related to Cattle (male Bull, female Cow) and Buffalo. However, Ox is the most commonly used one among all the synonyms.
The term  Rabbit can be translated as Hare, as 卯 (and 兔) do not distinguish between the two genera of leporids. As hares are native to China and most of Asia and rabbits are not, this would be more accurate. However, in colloquial English Rabbit can encompass hares as well.
The term  Snake can be translated as Serpent, which refers to a large species of snake and has the same behavior, although this term is rarely used.
The term  Goat can be translated as Sheep and Ram, a male Sheep. However, Goat is the most commonly used one among all the synonyms.
The term  Rooster can be translated interchangeably with Chicken, as well as the female Hen. However, Rooster is the most commonly used one among all the synonyms in English-speaking countries.

Adaptations

The Chinese zodiac signs are also used by cultures other than Chinese. For one example, they usually appear on Korean New Year and Japanese New Year's cards and stamps. The United States Postal Service and several other countries' postal services issue a "Year of the " postage stamp each year to honor this Chinese heritage.

The Chinese lunar coins, depicting the zodiac animals, inspired the Canadian Silver Maple Leaf coins, as well as varieties from Australia, South Korea, and Mongolia.

The Chinese zodiac is also used in some other Asian countries that have been under the cultural influence of China. However, some of the animals in the zodiac may differ by country.

Asian 

The Korean zodiac includes the Sheep (yang) instead of the Goat (which would be yeomso), although the Chinese source of the loanword yang may refer to any goat-antelope.

The Japanese zodiac includes the Sheep (hitsuji) instead of the Goat (which would be yagi), and the Wild boar (inoshishi, i) instead of the Pig (buta). Since 1873, the Japanese have celebrated the beginning of the new year on 1 January as per the Gregorian calendar.

The Vietnamese zodiac varies from the Chinese zodiac with the second animal being the Water Buffalo instead of the Ox, and the fourth animal being the Cat instead of the Rabbit.
 
The Cambodian zodiac is exactly identical to that of the Chinese although the dragon is interchangeable with the Neak (nāga) Cambodian sea snake. Sheep and Goat are interchangeable as well. The Cambodian New Year is celebrated in April, rather than in January or February as it is in China and most countries.

The Cham zodiac uses the same order as the Chinese zodiac, but replaces the Monkey with the turtle (known locally as kra).

Similarly the Malay zodiac is identical to the Chinese but replaces the Rabbit with the mousedeer (pelanduk) and the Pig with the tortoise (kura or kura-kura). The Dragon (Loong) is normally equated with the nāga but it is sometimes called Big Snake (ular besar) while the Snake sign is called Second Snake (ular sani). This is also recorded in a 19th-century manuscript compiled by John Leyden.

The Thai zodiac includes a nāga in place of the Dragon and begins, not at the Chinese New Year, but either on the first day of the fifth month in the Thai lunar calendar, or during the Songkran New Year festival (now celebrated every 13–15 April), depending on the purpose of the use.
Historically, Lan Na (Kingdom around Northern Thailand) also replace pig with Elephant. Modern Thai are changed back into pig, but the name กุน (gu̜n) which was meant elephant are still stuck as zodiac pronunciation 

The Gurung zodiac in Nepal includes a Cow instead of Ox, Cat instead of Rabbit, Eagle instead of Dragon (Loong), Bird instead of Rooster, and Deer instead of Pig.

The Bulgar calendar used from the 2nd century and that has been only partially reconstructed uses a similar sixty-year cycle of twelve animal-named years groups which are:

The Old Mongol calendar uses the Mouse, the Ox, the Leopard, the Hare, the Crocodile, the Serpent, the Horse, the Sheep, the Monkey, the Hen, the Dog and the Hog.

The Tibetan calendar replaces the Rooster with the bird.

The Volga Bulgars, Kazars and other Turkic peoples replaced some animals by local fauna: Leopard (instead of Tiger), Fish or Crocodile (instead of Dragon/Loong), Hedgehog (instead of Monkey), Elephant (instead of Pig), and Camel (instead of Rat/Mouse).

In the Persian version of the Eastern zodiac brought by Mongols during the Middle Ages, the Chinese word lóng and Mongol word lū (Dragon) was translated as nahang meaning "water beast", and may refer to any dangerous aquatic animal both mythical and real (crocodiles, hippos, sharks, sea serpents, etc.). In the 20th century the term nahang is used almost exclusively as meaning Whale, thus switching the Loong for the Whale in the Persian variant.

In the traditional Kazakh version of the 12-year animal cycle (müşel), the Dragon is substituted by a snail (ulw), and the Tiger appears as a leopard (barıs).

In the Kyrgyz version of the Chinese zodiac (müçöl) the words for the Dragon (uluu), Monkey (meçin) and Tiger (bars) are only found in Chinese zodiac names, other animal names are regular words used in everyday speech like Mouse, Cow, Rabbit, Snake, Horse, Sheep, Chicken, Dog and Wild boar.

Emoji

All early Japanese emoji sets had at least one suitable pictograph for each Eastern zodiac. They also had either a symbol or a pictograph subset for all the Western zodiac signs.

During the harmonization and standardization phase led by Unicode, some additional animals to represent local variants were added. Also, most signs got both a facial pictograph and a full-body one. For the full-body animals (U+1F400...4C), the local variant is recorded in the respective code point annotation. Some original emojis for applicable animals according to the previous subsection do not have such a note and all animal emojis that have been added in subsequent versions of Unicode are also not annotated for zodiac use:

 🐭 (no annotation in Unicode)
 🐀 default
 🐁 Persia
 🐪🐫 (no annotation in Unicode)
 🐮 (no annotation in Unicode)
 🐂 default
 🐄 Persia
 🐃 Vietnam
 🐯 (no annotation in Unicode)
 🐅 default
 🐆 Persia
 🐺 (no annotation in Unicode)
 🐰🐱 (no annotation in Unicode)
 🐇 default
 🐈 Vietnam
 🐲 (no annotation in Unicode)
 🐉 default
 🐊 Persia
 🐋 Persia, 🐳 (no annotation in Unicode)
 🐌 Kazakhstan
 🦈 (no annotation in Unicode)
 🐟 (no annotation in Unicode)
 🦛 (no annotation in Unicode)
 🦅 (no annotation in Unicode)
 🐍 
 🐴 (no annotation in Unicode)
 🐎
 🐏 default
 🐐 Vietnam, Malaysia
 🐑 Persia
 🐵 (no annotation in Unicode)
 🐒 default
 🐢 (no annotation in Unicode)
 🦔 (no annotation in Unicode)
 🐔 Persia
 🐓 default
 🐦 (no annotation in Unicode)
 🐶 (no annotation in Unicode)
 🐕 default
 🐩🦮🐕‍🦺 (no annotation in Unicode)
 🐷 (no annotation in Unicode)
 🐖 default
 🐗 Japan
 🐘 Thailand
 🐢 Malaysia
 🦌 (no annotation in Unicode)

Gallery

See also

 Chinese astrology
 Chinese spiritual world concepts
 Earthly Branches
 Astrology and science
 Chinese New Year

Notes

References

Sources 

 Shelly H. Wu. (2005). Chinese Astrology. Publisher: The Career Press, Inc. .

External links
 "The Year of the Rooster: On Seeing"
 "The Year of the Rooster, On Eating, Injecting, Imbibing & Speaking"
 "2016: The Golden Monkey, A Year to Remember"
 "The Dragon Raises its Head 龍抬頭"
 "2019 year of the Pig"
 "From the Year of the Ape to the Year of the Monkey " (on use of Zodiac figures for political criticism)
 

Astrology by tradition
Chinese astrology
Chinese calendars
Chinese culture
East Asian culture
Cultural lists